The Andøy Bridge is a cantilever road bridge that crosses the Risøysundet strait between the islands of Andøya and Hinnøya in Andøy Municipality in Nordland county, Norway. The northern end of the bridge is located in the village of Risøyhamn. The bridge has 21 spans.

The Andøy Bridge was opened in 1974. It was one of four bridges that were built in the 1970s to connect the islands of Vesterålen to each other. The other bridges that were built during that period are the Hadsel Bridge, Sortland Bridge, and Kvalsaukan Bridge. Together with the Tjeldsund Bridge in Harstad Municipality, these bridges connect the islands of Vesterålen to the mainland.  The Andøy Bridge was a toll bridge for many years after its opening.

See also
List of bridges in Norway
List of bridges in Norway by length
List of bridges
List of bridges by length

References

Road bridges in Nordland
Andøy
Bridges completed in 1974
Former toll bridges in Norway
1974 establishments in Norway
Norwegian County Road 82